Mesocolpia dexiphyma is a moth in the family Geometridae. It is found on Príncipe.

References

External links

Moths described in 1937
Eupitheciini
Moths of Africa